Mark Cline is an American artist and entertainer. Inspired by monster and science fiction films. He produces foam and fiberglass figures and fantasy characters for attractions and cities.

Cline has described Foamhenge as his greatest achievement. He later designed and built Bamahenge, a full-size fiberglass replica of Stonehenge, in Baldwin County, Alabama. Cline has also built hundreds of dinosaur statues, including thirty for his own Dinosaur Kingdom and nineteen for Dinosaur Land in White Post, Virginia, the park that inspired him to sculpt. Cline's work appears in attractions across Virginia, including a concentration of works in and around Natural Bridge, where he works out of Enchanted Castle Studios. His studio appears in the book Weird Virginia and the Roadside America books and website.

He often displays creations on April Fools' Day.  For example, Foamhenge was unveiled on April Fools' Day 2004.

Cline was born in 1961 in Waynesboro, Virginia, where in 1987 he unsuccessfully lobbied city council to erect a  bust of "Mad" Anthony Wayne atop the city's capped landfill.

Cline was often featured in The News Virginian. He completed a mural just outside city limits on a train bridge over U.S. Route 250.

In 2001 & 2012, a fire destroyed much of Cline's studio. Foamhenge was moved to the Cox Farm and Dinosaur Kingdom II across from the Natural Bridge Zoo.

References

External links
 Mark Cline's website
 Profile by The Washington Post
 Profile by The News Virginian
 Mark Cline at Julie's Tacky Treasures
 NBC29 April Fools' Day coverage

American artists
People from Waynesboro, Virginia
Living people
Year of birth missing (living people)